Edwin Ginn (February 14, 1838 – January 21, 1914) was an American publisher, peace advocate and philanthropist.

Biography

Ginn was born in Orland, Maine, on February 14, 1838, into a Universalist farming family who were descendants of early settlers of Maryland, Virginia, and Salem, Massachusetts. He attended Westbrook Seminary, a Universalist preparatory school. Forgoing the ministry, he enrolled instead at Tufts University in 1858. He graduated from Tufts with a Bachelor of Arts degree in 1862, receiving his Masters of Arts at the same time.

After graduation, Ginn had a successful career selling schoolbooks. In 1868, he founded Ginn & Company and Athenæum Press, which became a leading textbook American publisher. The company was later known as Ginn and Heath.

Ginn married twice, fathering six children. In his late 50s, Ginn turned his focus to philanthropy: the American peace movement was his primary concern.

Ginn died on January 21, 1914, at his home in Winchester, Massachusetts, after suffering from a paralytic stroke and pneumonia a month earlier. A library is named after him at Tufts's Fletcher School of Law and Diplomacy.

Peace movement

Influenced by Edward Everett Hale, a pastor of Boston's South Congregational Church, Ginn dedicated himself to the cause and the possibility of peace. On July 12, 1910, through a $1 million endowment, he founded the International School of Peace in Boston. whose purpose was "Educating the people of all nations to a full knowledge of the waste and destructiveness of war and of preparation for war, its evil effects on present social conditions and on the wellbeing of future generations, and to promote international justice and the brotherhood of man, and generally by every practical means to promote peace and goodwill among all mankind.
The school later became the World Peace Foundation. In 2007,  Robert I. Rotberg published A Leadership for Peace: How Edwin Ginn Tried to Change the World.

References

External links

 The Edwin Ginn Library

American publishers (people)
American pacifists
American Universalists
1838 births
People from Orland, Maine
1914 deaths
Deaths from pneumonia in Massachusetts
Westbrook College alumni
Tufts University alumni
19th-century American businesspeople